Christopher Paul Gethard (born May 23, 1980) is an American actor, comedian and writer. He was the host of The Chris Gethard Show, a talk show based in New York City, which aired from 2011 to 2018. He hosts the podcasts Beautiful Stories From Anonymous People and New Jersey is the World.

Early life 
Gethard grew up in West Orange, New Jersey, the son of Sally and Ken Gethard, and attended West Orange High School. As a kid, Gethard was a visitor of the infamous Action Park.

Career 
Gethard is an improvisational actor who works largely out of Manhattan's Upright Citizens Brigade Theatre. He began taking classes at the Upright Citizens Brigade Theatre in 2000 while he was a student at Rutgers University.

In 2013, the Independent Film Channel asked Gethard to write a pilot based on his book, A Bad Idea I'm About to Do. IFC gave Gethard a year, in addition to writing his pilot, to market for them at festivals and produce web content.

In August 2016, Gethard participated for the first time in the Edinburgh Festival Fringe, performing his show Career Suicide dealing with his experiences of depression, suicide attempts and alcoholism. During his run at the festival, he also recorded an episode of Stuart Goldsmith's "Comedian's Comedian Podcast", which was published in December 2016.

On May 6, 2017, HBO broadcast Career Suicide, an evening of standup comedy based on Gethard's off-Broadway show of the same title. Produced by Judd Apatow, the HBO special has garnered praise from The New York Times, Time, NPR, The A.V. Club, USA Today, Entertainment Weekly, The Daily Beast, Paste, The Huffington Post and Splitsider.

On October 10, 2019, he was featured in a 30-minute YouTube documentary called Laughing Matters, created by SoulPancake in collaboration with Funny or Die, wherein a variety of comedians discuss mental health.

The Chris Gethard Show

Gethard hosted The Chris Gethard Show, a talk show that originally aired on the Manhattan Neighborhood Network and was streamed around the world on Gethard's website. The show began as a live piece at the Upright Citizens Brigade Theater in 2009. Gethard then went to Los Angeles to pitch a network version of the show, but ended up returning to New York City to produce it for public-access because he wanted to retain the chaotic, cheap feel of early MTV talk shows. The show has since grown to consist of both stage and filmed performances. It has developed a reputation for outrageous spectacle, often featuring awkward viewer calls, high-concept group segments and Gethard subjecting himself to abuse, including an episode where he hired a kickboxer to hit him if he failed to answer simple questions about his friends. As a child, Gethard admired comedians who seemed to be able to do whatever they wanted, such as Howard Stern, Andy Kaufman, and David Letterman. This interest influenced the style of The Chris Gethard Show and laid the groundwork for Gethard's comedic persona.

The show was entirely self-funded, and none of the performers were paid for their time during its public access time. However, this largely surfaced as result of the style of Upright Citizens Brigade shows and the aesthetic of the show, Gethard had stated that he would not be opposed to the show being picked up by a television network. He met with a number of network producers, but the show was not picked up, the primary concern being its unpredictable nature and frequent swearing. In early 2014, Comedy Central ordered a pilot from TCGS, to be co-produced by Funny or Die, leading to a brief hiatus from the weekly program. The pilot was taped but ultimately not picked up by Comedy Central. The show returned to MNN from April to January 2015. In its final MNN episode, it was announced that the show had been picked up by Fusion, where it ran for two seasons.

Throughout the show's many manifestations, it has attracted a number of celebrity guests, including P. Diddy, Amy Poehler, Will Ferrell, Paul Giamatti, and Lena Dunham.

After its run on Fusion, The Chris Gethard Show was picked up for a third season by truTV, and began airing live episodes in August 2017. In August 2018, Gethard announced the show had been canceled and would not return for another season.

Beautiful/Anonymous
Gethard hosts the Earwolf podcast Beautiful/Anonymous, which first aired on March 15, 2016. The following is Earwolf's description of the show: "1 phone call. 1 hour. No names. No holds barred. That’s the premise behind Beautiful Stories from Anonymous People, hosted by comedian Chris Gethard...Every week, Chris opens the phone line to one anonymous caller, and he can’t hang up first, no matter what. From shocking confessions and family secrets to philosophical discussions and shameless self-promotion, anything can and will happen!" He won the Webby Award for Best Host in 2017.

In Your Dreams
Gethard co-hosted Earwolf's podcast, In Your Dreams, with Gary Richardson. The podcast first aired on December 12, 2016 with special guest comedian Aparna Nancherla, and the ninth and final episode aired on February 6, 2017.

Planet Scum Live 

Gethard has hosted the show Planet Scum Live, the title of which was given to his live streaming comedy network, since May 3, 2020.

Books
Gethard is also the author of Weird NY, a book detailing the ghost stories and urban legends of New York City, and A Bad Idea I'm About to Do, a collection of stories from Gethard's life, which has been highlighted on This American Life. Previously, Gethard served as an editorial assistant for the popular Weird NJ and Weird US publications. On October 16, 2018, Gethard's self-help narrative Lose Well was published out of HarperCollins's HarperOne imprint.

Interactions with fans
The Chris Gethard Show is well known for its audience interaction. One show featured a woman calling in to inquire about the purpose of the show. Gethard invited her to join them and she became a regular for four months. After this the notion of random, unknown fans becoming regular cast members became popular. The show continued this trend through its public access run, having a new "random" as a cast member for 15 episodes.

Personal life
Gethard married Hallie Bulleit, band leader for The Chris Gethard Show, on August 30, 2014 in Brooklyn, New York. The service was performed by fellow Chris Gethard Show cast member Murf Meyer. The couple had a son, Caleb David Gethard, in April 2019.

He is an avid fan of The Smiths and has two tattoos related to the band—Morrissey's signature on his right shoulder (based on an actual signature he got in marker on his arm), and "It takes strength to be gentle and kind," a lyric from "I Know It's Over," on his right biceps.

Gethard has stated that his favorite sport is basketball and he is a New York Knicks fan. His favorite player growing up was Knicks guard John Starks, who appeared on The Chris Gethard Show in 2016.

His brother, Gregg Gethard, frequently performs as "Financial Guru Gregg Gethard".

Discography
 My Comedy Album (2014)
 Career Suicide (2017)
 Taylor Ham, Egg, And Cheese (2019)
 Chris Gethard: Half My Life (2021)

Filmography

Films

Television

References

External links 

 
 The Chris Get Hard Show – Comedy at its finest
 

21st-century American comedians
21st-century American male actors
21st-century American screenwriters
1980 births
American humorists
American information and reference writers
American male comedians
American male film actors
American male television actors
American male television writers
American podcasters
American public access television personalities
American television talk show hosts
American television writers
Don Giovanni Records artists
Living people
Male actors from New Jersey
People from West Orange, New Jersey
Screenwriters from New Jersey
Upright Citizens Brigade Theater performers
West Orange High School (New Jersey) alumni
21st-century American male writers